Magnus Norman was the defending champion but did not compete that year.

Tommy Haas won in the final 6–3, 3–6, 6–2 against Pete Sampras.

Seeds
A champion seed is indicated in bold text while text in italics indicates the round in which that seed was eliminated.

 n/a
  Àlex Corretja (first round)
  Pete Sampras (final)
  Arnaud Clément (semifinals)
  Thomas Johansson (semifinals)
  Tommy Haas (champion)
  Goran Ivanišević (first round)
  Jan-Michael Gambill (first round)
  Thomas Enqvist (quarterfinals)

Draw

References
 2001 Hamlet Cup Draw

Connecticut Open (tennis)
2001 ATP Tour